William W. Bedsworth (born November 21, 1947, in Long Beach, California) is an Associate Justice of the California Court of Appeal.

Background
Justice Bedsworth grew up in Gardena, California. He lives in Laguna Beach and is married to Kelly.  He also has a 16-year-old daughter, Caitlin.
He graduated with a Bachelor of Arts Degree (cum laude) from Loyola Marymount University in 1968 and earned his Juris Doctor at the University of California, Berkeley (Boalt Hall School of Law) in 1971.  He was admitted to the State Bar of California in January 1972.

Legal career
Bedsworth worked as a prosecutor in the Orange County District Attorney's Office (line deputy, felony trial deputy, appellate attorney, and managing attorney) as an Orange County deputy district attorney from 1972–1987. He handled cases in the California and United States Supreme Courts.  He twice was elected President of the Association of Orange County Deputy District Attorneys and twice was elected to serve as a Director of the Board of the Orange County Bar Association.

In 1986, he won election to an Orange County Superior Court seat; he was re-elected in 1992 and February 1997 (he was Orange County Superior Court judge, 1987–1997).  He was assigned by California Supreme Court as temporary appellate justice from April to December 1994.

On February 25, 1997, Governor Pete Wilson appointed him an associate justice of the California Court of Appeal for the Fourth District, Division 3 in Santa Ana, and he was confirmed to serve in that position from 1998 through 2010.

The Court of Appeal is the state intermediate appellate court in the State of California.  It is divided into 6 appellate districts.  Its published decisions are binding on the superior courts, and the Court of Appeal, in turn, is bound by decisions of the Supreme Court of California. Justice Bedsworth serves as a Justice in the Fourth District, Division Three, Court of Appeal in Santa Ana.  The Division Three courthouse is located at 925 No. Spurgeon Street in Santa Ana and handles appeals from all of Orange County.

Academic activities and publications
Bedsworth was a member of the adjunct faculty of Western State University College of Law, Chapman University School of Law, the California Judicial College in Berkeley, and the Board of Advisors of Whittier Law School. Bedworth is a current member of the adjunct faculty of University of California, Irvine School of Law.

He has published law review articles and in lay magazines.  He has long written a column entitled, "A Criminal Waste of Space," and recently published his second book, "A Criminal Waste of Time" (American Lawyer Media Publications).  He writes regularly for the Orange County Lawyer magazine.  The California Newspaper Publishers' Association named Bedsworth's "A Criminal Waste of Space" best work in the field of 'Columns, Commentary, and Criticism' in a paper of under 10,000 circulation for 2004.

Other activities

He became a Director on the Board of National Conference of Christians and Jews and Fair Share 502 and was voted by the Hispanic Bar Association as Judge of the Year in 1997.
He spent several years as a goal judge for the National Hockey League at all Anaheim Ducks home games and some road playoff games, and he became the subject of a story in ESPN The Magazine entitled "Justice of the Crease".

See also 
 Supreme Court of California
 California Court of Appeal

References

External links 
A CRIMINAL WASTE OF SPACE
Criminal Waste of Space
 The Bedsworth Pygmy Hippo Jailbreak Rule, A modest proposal for the emendation of CALJIC 2.92
William W. Bedsworth, Associate Justice
 California Judicial System
 Appellate Case Information System
 A Criminal Waste of Time by William W. Bedsworth

1947 births
Living people
People from Long Beach, California
Loyola Marymount University alumni
UC Berkeley School of Law alumni
Judges of the California Courts of Appeal
20th-century American judges
21st-century American judges